Pratidwani is a 1971 Kannada-language film directed by Dorai–Bhagavan. The film stars Rajkumar, Rajesh and Aarathi, along with Narasimharaju, Balakrishna, Pandaribai in supporting roles, with Dinesh as the leader of the smugglers.

Plot
As the name represents, pratidhwani (resound) in other terms, means reacting to what has happened. The film starts with the smuggler Dinesh whose driver is killed along with his wife, and daughter. But his two sons are left alive and take an oath to kill the smuggler. When the children are grown up, they are separated. Anand (Rajesh) is a robber. Ashok (Rajkumar) is a police inspector. Both are in search of the killer. Ashok meets Aarathi and falls in love with her. Once Anand comes to rob Ashok's house and sees his childhood photo. The brothers reunite and go on attacking the killer per their own plan. Finally, with help of a small drama, they release the killer and send him to jail.

Cast
 Rajkumar as Ashok
 Arathi
 Rajesh as Anand
 Balakrishna
 Narasimharaju as Narasayya
 Pandari Bai as Meenakshi
 Dinesh as Bhushan
 R. T. Ramadevi
 Tiger Prabhakar

Soundtrack

References

External links 
 

1970s Kannada-language films
1971 films
Films scored by G. K. Venkatesh
Films directed by Dorai–Bhagavan